"My Michigan" is the state song of Michigan.

History
It was written by Giles Kavanagh (lyrics) and H. O'Reilly Clint (music) in 1933.  It was published by Clint's own music publishing company at Detroit.  It was formally adopted as an official state song by the Michigan Legislature in 1937 by Concurrent Resolution 17.

Despite being an official state anthem, the song is very rarely sung and has never been used on formal state occasions.  This may be because doing so would incur liability to pay a royalty.  The State did not purchase and/or the authors would not sell the copyright. Its copyright will expire at the end of 2028, the 95th year after its publication, per the Copyright Term Extension Act.

There are two versions of the sheet music; one is held at the Rare Book Room at the Library of Michigan and the other is housed at the Bentley Historical Museum.

References
Citations

Further reading

 (reference to "My Michigan" song)

Music of Michigan
American songs
Michigan
Songs about Michigan